Vexillum clarum, common name : the Queen Mitre,  is a species of small sea snail, marine gastropod mollusk in the family Costellariidae, the ribbed miters.

Distribution
This marine species occurs off the Philippines.

References

 Huang S.-I [Shih-I] & Lin M.-H. [Ming-Hui]. (2020). Five new Vexillum from the Philippines (Gastropoda: Costellariidae). Bulletin of Malacology, Taiwan. 43: 1–12.

clarum
Gastropods described in 2020